Nora Marie Theres Beatrice Elisabeth Waldstätten (born 1 December 1981), also formerly known as Nora von Waldstätten, is an Austrian actress.

Early life
Born Nora Marie Theres [Beatrice Elisabeth] von Waldstätten in Vienna, Austria in 1981, Nora Waldstätten was raised in Baden, Austria, the third of four children in a family descended from old Austrian nobility. From 2003-2007, she studied acting at Berlin University of the Arts. During this time, she was engaged in productions for cinema and television.

Career

Film and television work

In 2004-2005, Nora [von] Waldstätten had small roles in Constantin von Jascheroff's Jargo and Christoph Hochhäus­ler's Falsche Bekenner. In 2008, she co-starred alongside Sabrina Ouazani in Irene von Alberti's German-Morrocan film, Tangerine. As described by Antje Wewer of the Süddeutsche Zeitung, she first became more widely known through her role as a student murderess in the episode, "Herz aus Eis" (2009), of the series, Tatort, a police procedural. She received the Bunte New Faces Award in 2009 for her performance in that series. In addition, she acted in the film Schwerkraft (Gravity, 2009), for which she was honored with the Max Ophüls Award for best young actress, at the 2010 film festival. 

In a drama with international casting, Waldstätten appeared as the role of Magdalena Kopp in Olivier Assayas' 2010 miniseries, Carlos, about the convicted Venezuelan murderer and terrorist, "Carlos the Jackal", a role, though containing a strong sex scene, was honored at the 2010 Cannes Film Festival, and was awarded a Golden Globe in 2011. In 2011 she appeared in a short film as a testimonial for the Austrian beverage bottler . In 2012, she starred in the international TV adaptation of Ken Follett's novel World Without End, and in 2015 in the Austrian TV series Altes Geld. In 2016, she starred in Olivier Assayas' 2016 work, Personal Shopper with Kristen Stewart and Lars Eidinger, that won Best Director award for Assayas at Cannes.

Theatrical work
Since 2007, Waldstätten has played in several productions at the Deutsches Theater in Berlin. There, she appeared in the Jelinek play, Über Animals. In 2010, she also appeared in two plays at the Schauspiel Köln.

Personal life

Waldstätten is the child of an old Austrian noble family. She is the great-granddaughter of the former general, Theresien Knight, and military writer Egon Freiherr von Waldstätten. Since the Austrian law that eliminated nobility forbade use of noble titles, Waldstätten does not use the "von" of her birth name, publicly. In Germany the allusion to nobility is not restricted, and so at the beginning of her career, Waldstätten used "von Waldstätten" as a stage name, which she continued until the end of 2016. 

Waldstätten lives in Berlin.

Awards and nominations

Further reading

References

External links

 
 

1981 births
Living people
Actresses from Vienna
Austrian expatriates in Germany
Berlin University of the Arts alumni
Austrian television actresses